Excelsior Township is one of twelve townships in Dickinson County, Iowa, USA.  As of the 2000 census, its population was 186.

Geography
According to the United States Census Bureau, Excelsior Township covers an area of 36.36 square miles (94.16 square kilometers); of this, 36.24 square miles (93.86 square kilometers, 99.68 percent) is land and 0.12 square miles (0.3 square kilometers, 0.32 percent) is water.

Adjacent townships
 Silver Lake Township (north)
 Diamond Lake Township (northeast)
 Lakeville Township (east)
 Okoboji Township (southeast)
 Westport Township (south)
 Harrison Township, Osceola County (southwest)
 Allison Township, Osceola County (west)
 Fairview Township, Osceola County (northwest)

Cemeteries
The township contains Excelsior Township Cemetery.

Major highways
  Iowa Highway 9

Lakes
 Stony Lake

School districts
 Harris-Lake Park Community School District
 Okoboji Community School District

Political districts
 Iowa's 5th congressional district
 State House District 06
 State Senate District 03

References
 United States Census Bureau 2007 TIGER/Line Shapefiles
 United States Board on Geographic Names (GNIS)
 United States National Atlas

External links

 
US-Counties.com
City-Data.com

Townships in Dickinson County, Iowa
Townships in Iowa